Minnelli (also spelled Minelli) is an Italian surname. Notable people with the surname include:

Minelli, born Luisa Ionela Luca, Romanian singer, songwriter and lyricist.
Alessandro Minelli - multiple people
Liza Minnelli, American actress, dancer, and singer
Ludwig Minelli (born 1932), Swiss lawyer
Pablo Minelli (born 1969), Argentine swimmer
Rubens Minelli (born 1928), Brazilian former football player and manager
Simone Minelli (born 1997), Italian football forward 
Stefano Minelli (born 1994), Italian football goalkeeper 
Vincente Minnelli, American film director

Italian-language surnames